Clonava is a townland in County Westmeath, Ireland.

Clonava is one of 35 townlands of the civil parish of Street in the barony of Moygoish in the Province of Leinster. The townland contains the settlement of Clonave. North of Lough Derravaragh, the River Inny forms the eastern boundary of the townland. Peat is extracted from wetlands that cover the north of Clonava and parts of neighbouring townlands.

The neighbouring townlands are: Coolnagun to the north, Shrubbywood to the north–east. Derrya to the east, Lackan and Lackanwood to the south and Clonkeen and Bottomy to the west.

In the 1911 census of Ireland there were 15 houses and 63 inhabitants in the townland.

References

External links
Map of Clonava at openstreetmap.org
Clonava at the IreAtlas Townland Data Base
Clonava at Townlands.ie
 Clonava at The Placenames Database of Ireland, Department of Arts, Heritage and the Gaeltacht

Townlands of County Westmeath